Catabolite Control Protein A (CcpA) is a master regulator of carbon metabolism in gram-positive bacteria.  It is a member of the LacI/GalR transcription regulator family.  In contrast to most LacI/GalR proteins, CcpA is allosterically regulated principally by a protein-protein interaction, rather than a protein-small molecule interaction.  CcpA interacts with the phosphorylated form of Hpr and Crh, which is formed when high concentrations of glucose or fructose-1,6-bisphosphate are present in the cell.  Interaction of Hpr or Crh modulates the DNA sequence specificity of CcpA, allowing it to bind operator DNA to modulate transcription.  Small molecules glucose-6-phosphate and fructose-1,6-bisphosphate are also known allosteric effectors, fine-tuning CcpA function.

Structure 

The DNA-binding functional unit of CcpA consists of a homodimer.  The N-terminal region of each monomer form a DNA-binding site while the C-terminal portion forms a "regulatory" domain.  A short linker connects the N-terminal DNA binding domain and the C-terminal regulatory domain, which partially contacts DNA when bound.  The LacI/GalR subfamily can be functionally subdivided based on the presence or absence of a "YxxPxxxAxxL" motif in the liker sequence;  CcpA belongs to the subdivision containing this motif. The regulatory domain is further subdivided into a N-terminal and C-terminal subdomain.  Small molecule effector binding occurs in the cleft between these subdomains.  Binding to phosphorylated Hpr/Crh occurs along the regulatory domain's N-subdomain.

References 

Proteins